Brilant Syla (born 27 February 1991) is an ethnic Albanian professional football player from the Republic of Macedonia who played for KF Elbasani in the Albanian Superliga.

References 

1991 births
Living people
Sportspeople from Tetovo
Albanian footballers from North Macedonia
Association football midfielders
Macedonian footballers
FK Renova players
KF Shkëndija players
FC Drita players
SC Gjilani players
FK Korab players
KF Gostivari players
KF Elbasani players
FK Vëllazërimi 77 players
Macedonian Second Football League players
Football Superleague of Kosovo players
Kategoria Superiore players
Macedonian expatriate footballers
Expatriate footballers in Kosovo
Macedonian expatriate sportspeople in Kosovo
Expatriate footballers in Albania
Macedonian expatriate sportspeople in Albania